Steen Thychosen (born 22 September 1958) is a former Danish footballer, who played 252 games and scored 101 goals for Vejle Boldklub. He was a forward, who also represented German club Borussia Mönchengladbach, Belgian club RWD Molenbeek and Lausanne in Switzerland. He played two games for the Denmark national football team.

Honours
Vejle
Danish 1st Division: 1978, 1984
Danish Cup: 1976–77

Borussia Mönchengladbach
UEFA Cup: 1978–79

Individual
Danish 1st Division top scorer: 1984 (24 goals, Vejle)
Swiss National League A top scorer: 1985–86 (21 goals, Lausanne Sports)

References

External links
Danish national team profile
Vejle Boldklub profile 

1958 births
Living people
Danish men's footballers
Danish expatriate men's footballers
Vejle Boldklub players
Borussia Mönchengladbach players
UEFA Cup winning players
Danish expatriate sportspeople in West Germany
Expatriate footballers in West Germany
R.W.D. Molenbeek players
Danish expatriate sportspeople in Belgium
Expatriate footballers in Belgium
FC Lausanne-Sport players
Danish expatriate sportspeople in Switzerland
Expatriate footballers in Switzerland
Denmark international footballers
Denmark under-21 international footballers
Denmark youth international footballers
UEFA Euro 1984 players
Danish football managers
Swiss Super League players
Danish Superliga players
Bundesliga players
Vejle Boldklub managers
Association football forwards
People from Vejle Municipality
Danish 1st Division managers
Sportspeople from the Region of Southern Denmark